Ataba Kingdom is a coastal town in Andoni, Rivers State, Nigeria. The town is known for its abundant coconut and palm kernel shells. The town is at the western end of Andoni with several adjoining towns. Over several centuries Ataba has been a receptacle of different waves of migration. On the mainland the town is internally structured into nine quarters: Egweisiyork (the royal seat/quarter), Egweite, Egweogogor, Egwebe, Egweaba, Egweituk, Egweosot, Egweaja, and Egwenkan.
In terms of political administration Ataba has two political wards and has a dominant presence in the politics of Andoni. Ataba is the headquarters of Andoni West Archdeaconry of the Church of Nigeria Anglican Communion with its Church St. James Anglican Church.

Ataba occupies large expanse of land with land borders with four Local Government Areas (namely: Bonny, Ogu-Bolo, Gokana and Khana LGAs) and swampy creeks with abundance of sea foods and is bordered by Bonny LGA on South West, Ogu-Bolo LGA on the North West, Gokana and Khana LGAs on the North, other Andoni communities on the East and the Atlantic ocean on the South.

The ongoing multi Billion Naira Bodo-Ataba-Bonny road being funded by the NLNG and the Federal Government of Nigeria is bound to open up Ataba and Bonny LGA, which has never been connected to the hinterland to the much needed development.

References

Towns in Rivers State
Populated coastal places in Rivers State